Margaret, Countess of Comminges (1366-1443), was a Countess regnant suo jure of Comminges in 1375-1443. 

Daughter of her predecessor. She was the Co-ruler of her husbands, John III, Count of Armagnac, John of Armagnac (son of Geraud, Viscount of Fezensaguet) and Mathieu of Foix. In 1453, Comminges was reunited to the French crown by King Charles VII of France.

References

 Christine Lalanne-Belair, « Marguerite de Comminges : la fin d'un comté », Revue de Comminges, Société des études du Comminges, no 2,‎ 2016, p. 453-458 (ISSN 0035-1059).

14th-century women rulers
15th-century women rulers
1443 deaths
Counts of Comminges